Elections to Sheffield City Council were held on 10 June 2004. The whole council was up for election with boundary changes having taken place since the last election in 2003, reducing the number of seats by 3. This election was the first all-postal vote election held, dramatically improving overall turnout by 14.4% on the previous election to 43.9%. The Labour Party kept its overall majority and continued to run the council, albeit on a much slimmer majority. Previous to the boundary changes, sitting Hillsborough councillor Peter MacLoughlin defected from the Liberal Democrats to an Independent, choosing not to contest this election.

Election result

|}

This result has the following consequences for the total number of seats on the Council after the elections:

Ward results

Arbourthorne
Julie Dore and John Robson were sitting councillors for Park, Timothy Rippon was a sitting councillor for Southey Green, Robert McCann was a sitting councillor for Intake, Christopher Tutt was a sitting councillor for Norton

Beauchief & Greenhill
James Hanson was a sitting councillor for Owlerton

Beighton
Christopher Rosling-Josephs was a sitting councillor for Mosborough

Birley
Bryan Lodge, Angela Smith and Michael Pye were sitting councillors for Birley

Broomhill
Paul Scriven and Alan Whitehouse were sitting councillors for Broomhill

Burngreave
Jacqueline Drayton, Ibrar Hussain and Stephen Jones were sitting councillors for Burngreave

Central
Jean Cromar and Mohammad Nazir were sitting councillors for Sharrow, Mohammed Khan was a sitting councillor for Firth Park

Crookes
Brian Holmes and Sylvia Anginotti were sitting councillors for Netherthorpe, Leonard Hesketh was a sitting councillor for Hallam

Darnall
Mary Lea and Mohammed Altaf were sitting councillors for Darnall, Harry Harpham was a sitting councillor for Manor

Dore & Totley
Anne Smith, Keith Hill and Colin Ross were sitting councillors for Dore

East Ecclesfield
Patricia Fox and Graham Oxley were sitting councillors for Chapel Green, Victoria Bowden was a sitting councillor for South Wortley, Beverley Wright was a sitting councillor for Norton

Ecclesall
Sylvia Dunkley, Ruth Dawson and Roger Davison were sitting councillors for Ecclesall

Firth Park
Joan Barton and Alan Law were sitting councillors for Firth Park, Christopher Weldon was a sitting councillor for Owlerton

Fulwood
John Knight was a sitting councillor for Hallam, Andrew Sangar was a sitting councillor for Beauchief, Janice Sidebottom was a sitting councillor for Broomhill

Gleadless Valley
Terence Fox was a sitting councillor for Heeley, Garry Weatherall was a sitting councillor for Norton

Graves Park
Peter Moore was a sitting councillor for Beauchief

Hillsborough
Robert MacDonald and Janet Bragg were sitting councillors for Hillsborough, Alfred Meade was a sitting councillor for Brightside

Manor Castle
Patricia Midgley and Janet Wilson were sitting councillors for Castle, Janet Fiore was a sitting councillor for Manor

Mosborough
Samuel Wall was a sitting councillor for Mosborough

Nether Edge
Ali Qadar, Andrew White and Patricia White were sitting councillors for Nether Edge

Richmond
Martin Lawton and John Campbell were sitting councillors for Intake, Terry Barrow was a sitting councillor for Darnall

Shiregreen & Brightside
Jane Bird and Peter Rippon were sitting councillors for Nether Shire, Peter Price was a sitting councillor for Brightside, Michael Davis was a sitting councillor for Beauchief

Southey
Anthony Damms was a sitting councillor for Southey Green, Gillian Furniss was a sitting councillor for Manor

Stannington
Arthur Dunworth and David Baker were sitting councillors for South Wortley, John Webster was a sitting councillor for Brightside, Steven Wilson was a sitting councillor for Southey Green

Stocksbridge & Upper Don
Martin Davis and Martin Brelsford were sitting councillors for Stocksbridge

Walkley
Diane Leek, Veronica Hardstaff and Jonathan Harston were sitting councillors for Walkley, Stephen Ayris was a sitting councillor for Netherthorpe

West Ecclesfield
Kathleen Chadwick was a sitting councillor for Chapel Green

Woodhouse
Marjorie Barker, Michael Rooney and Raymond Satur were sitting councillors for Handsworth

By-elections between 2004 and 2006

References

2004 English local elections
2004
2000s in Sheffield